Lalkhatanga is a small Village/hamlet in Namkum Block in Ranchi district of Jharkhand State, India. It comes under anchal of Namkum. It is located 16 km from District headquarters and State capital Ranchi.

Physiography

Ranchi Sadar Block towards west , Kanke Block towards North , Angara Block towards East , Ratu Block towards west.

Social structure
People in Lalkhatanga are very peaceful and they all love communal harmony. Mainly this village comprises large number of Christian Munda people with the surname Horo.

Demographics 
Hindi and Nagpuri are the most spoken languages in Lakhatanga.

Transport

Rail
There are two major railway stations near to Lalkhatanga in less than 10 km. However Hatia railway station is the nearest railway station of about 3.5 km distance from Lalkatanga.

Roadways
Roads connecting major cities are providing movement for passenger and freight traffic. There is a district road connecting Torpa, Murhu, Govindpur, Khunti and Ranchi.

Healthcare
To cater the medical needs of patients, especially those with tuberculosis, people go to:
 Govt. Hospital Khunti
 Ramkrishna Sanatorium

Schools, colleges and universities 
For making children literate the state government provides:

 Govt. Basic School 
 Jaipal Singh High School
 Birsa College Khunti
 St Joseph Intermediate College, Torpa
Indian Institute of Agricultural Biotechnology

Tourism and Entertainment
Biodiversity Park, Ranchi

References

Villages in Khunti district